The Bunya Highway is a state highway of Queensland, Australia. It is a relatively short road, running approximately 173 kilometres in a south-westerly direction from Goomeri to Dalby. The highway connects the Warrego and Burnett Highways.

The Bunya Highway passes near the Bunya Mountains National Park, which is popular with tourists. The highway is named after the Bunya-bunya Araucaria bidwilli, which grows in the area and the seeds of which were (and still are) a favourite food of the Aborigines.

The road continues east of Goomeri as the Wide Bay Highway, connecting it to Gympie.

In 2008, the intersection with Burnett Highway was reconstructed to favour Murgon-bound traffic.

List of towns along the Bunya Highway
 Dalby
 Bell
 Kumbia
 Kingaroy
 Memerambi
 Wooroolin
 Tingoora
 Wondai
 Murgon
 Goomeri

Major intersections

See also

 Highways in Australia
 List of highways in Queensland

References

Highways in Queensland